is a district located in Gifu Prefecture, Japan. As of July 2011, the district has an estimated population of 18,709. The total area is 56.61 km2.

There is only one town left in the district, Mitake.

District Timeline
April 1, 1982 - The town of Kani gained city status.
May 1, 2005 - The town of Kaneyama was merged into the city of Kani.

Notes

Districts in Gifu Prefecture